Hojjat Adeli from Ohio State University, Columbus, OH was named Fellow of the Institute of Electrical and Electronics Engineers (IEEE) in 2012 for contributions to computational intelligence in infrastructure engineering and also an Elected Fellow of the American Association for the Advancement of Science.

References

External links 

 Hojjat Adeli on Telegram

Fellow Members of the IEEE
Ohio State University faculty
21st-century American engineers
Living people
1950 births